The modern Chinese tunic suit is a style of male attire originally known in China as the Zhongshan suit after the republican leader Sun Yat-sen (Sun Zhongshan). Sun Yat-sen introduced the style shortly after  the founding of the Republic of China (1912–1949) as a form of national dress with distinct political overtones. He based the suit on the Japanese cadet uniform. The four pockets are said to represent the Four Virtues of propriety, justice, honesty, and shame; and the five buttons the branches of China's former government (Executive, Legislative, Judicial, Examination, Control), which still survive today in the Republic of China government of Taiwan.

After the Communist victory in the Chinese Civil War and the establishment of the People's Republic of China in 1949, such suits came to be worn widely by male citizens and government leaders as a symbol of proletarian unity and an Eastern counterpart to the Western business suit. The name "Mao suit" comes from Chinese Communist Mao Zedong's fondness for the style. The garment became closely associated with him and with Chinese Communism. Mao's cut of the suit was further influenced by the Stalin tunic then prevalent among Soviet officials. Although it declined in use among the general public in the 1980s and 1990s due to the increasing prominence of the business suit, it is still commonly worn by Chinese leaders during important state ceremonies and functions. The Mao suit was also worn in North Korea by party elites. 

In the 1960s and 1970s, the Mao suit became fashionable among Western European, Australian, and New Zealander socialists and intellectuals. It was sometimes worn over a turtleneck.

Origins 
When the Republic was founded in 1912, the style of dress worn in China was based on Manchu dress (qipao and changshan), which had been imposed by the Qing Dynasty as a form of social control. The majority-Han Chinese revolutionaries who overthrew the Qing were fueled by the failure of the Qing to defend China and a lack of scientific advancement compared to foreign colonial powers. Even before the founding of the Republic, older forms of Chinese dress were becoming unpopular among the elite and led to the development of Chinese dress which combined the changshan and the European hat to form a new dress. The Zhongshan suit is a parallel development that combined European-inspired Chinese fashion.

Historical development

The Mao suit remained the standard formal dress for the first and second generations of PRC leaders such as Deng Xiaoping. During the 1990s, it began to be worn with decreasing frequency by leaders of CCP General Secretary Jiang Zemin's generation as more and more Chinese politicians began wearing traditional European-style suits with neckties. Jiang wore it only on special occasions, such as to state dinners. General Secretary Hu Jintao still wore the Mao suit, but only on special occasions, such as the ceremony marking the 60th anniversary of the People's Republic in 2009. Hu Jintao even showed up to a black tie state dinner in the United States wearing a business suit, attracting some criticism for being underdressed at a formal occasion. In the Xi Jinping Administration, however, the Mao suit made a comeback as a diplomatic uniform and evening dress.

Symbol of national sovereignty
The Mao suit is worn at the most formal ceremonies as a symbol of national sovereignty.  China's paramount leaders always wear Mao suits for military parades in Beijing, even though other Politburo Standing Committee members and other Politburo officials wear European business suits.  It is customary for Chinese leaders to wear Mao suits when attending state dinners.  In this situation, the Mao suit serves as a form of evening dress, equivalent to a military uniform for a monarch, or a tuxedo for a paramount leader.

The Mao suit also serves as a diplomatic uniform.  Although Chinese ambassadors usually wear European business suits, many Chinese ambassadors choose to wear a Mao suit when they present their credentials to the head of state.  The presentation ceremony is symbolic of the diplomatic recognition that exists between the two countries, so it carries a higher level of formality than other diplomatic meetings.

See also 

 Abacost
 Barong Tagalog
 Chinese clothing
Nehru jacket
 Feldbluse
 French (tunic)
 Gakuran
 Jodhpuri
 Kariba suit
 Madiba shirt
 Mandarin collar
 Safari jacket
 Stalin tunic

References

External links 

 History of the Mao Suit

20th-century fashion
Chinese clothing
History of fashion
Military uniforms
Clothing in politics
Mao Zedong